Yamsafer was an online accommodation booking website in the Middle East. The company combined website, mobile app and call center booking methods in its service delivery for all destination around the world. It was tokened by Tech Crunch, as the "Middle East's Booking.com".

History
Yamsafer was founded in 2011 by Palestinian entrepreneurs Faris Zaher, Sameh Alfar and Seri Abdelhadi. The startup went on to become the first Palestinian company to secure an early-stage venture capital investment. The close of the first early stage investment round in Ramallah marked a new era for entrepreneurship in Palestine. In June 2015 Yamsafer went on to secure $3.5m in its Series B round from Global Founders Capital, marking the largest round of venture capital financing to be raised by a Palestine-based company and the first-ever foreign led round of investment in a local company. In October 2018 the company ranked 5th in "Top 12 Up and Coming Companies In The Middle East" by Forbes. The selection criteria were based on providing a sustainable business model, raising significant amounts of capital and delivering growth to investors.

With COVID-19 virus spreading and travel restrictions imposed around the world, the company had gone into some financial hardships and eventually closed down as the tourism sector was heavily affected by the pandemic.

Innovations

Cardless Booking
In January 2014, Yamsafer was the first in the travel industry to provide the unique feature of "Cardless Bookings™", where customers do not need a credit card to guarantee or confirm a hotel reservation (Yahoo Finance), but instead are required to make payment once they arrive at the hotel. The feature is currently available in select cities: Amman, Madaba, Aqaba, Dead Sea, Ramallah, Bethlehem, Cairo, Jeddah, Kuwait City and Manama.
"Cardless Bookings" feature has been introduced to its customers as a result of the significantly low credit card penetration rates in the MENA region compared to more global mature markets, and to also help eliminate online customer fears of providing their credit card information online. With the "Cardless Bookings" feature, Yamsafer has removed the traditional deposit fee requirements usually requested by hotels of their guests."

Yamsafer's Mobile Application
In 2015, Yamsafer released a mobile booking app with the purpose of pushing top deals with last minute prices. Such measures fill the gap between unoccupied hotel rooms and same day bookers. The app enables users to browse city pages, find hotels, book themselves, or call the Yamsafer team for free, 24/7. In an interview, Faris Zaher, the CEO commented: "Expensive call roaming charges and long call-waiting queues both make for a horrible customer service experience. We’ve changed all of that by putting top VoIP (Voice over IP) technology to work."

Yamsafer Homes
In 2016, Yamsafer launched Yamsafer Homes, its own vacation rental brand. 
Yamsafer Homes are distributed in various locations around the world.

Recognition
Yamsafer is being recognized in the MENA region for its high quality Arabic and English content, targeting Arabic-speaking clients, the online travel booking company caters to travelers in the Middle East, while still catering to all in the online travel space. Yamsafer also provides smaller hotels and guesthouses, which were previously offline, the opportunity to market themselves in an online space and serve international markets.

In January 2011, Wamda selected Yamsafer as the Best ecommerce startup as part of the Best MENA Startups of 2011 competition. In early June 2015, Yamsafer announced closing its 2nd round of investment of US$3.5 Million, led by Global Founders Capital with participation by Sadara Ventures and other undisclosed investors.

References

External links
Official Website

Companies based in the State of Palestine
Palestinian travel websites